The Miss Universo Paraguay 2011 pageant was held on June 23, 2011. Yohana Benítez, Miss Universo Paraguay 2010; Egni Eckert, Miss Mundo Paraguay 2010; and María José Paredes, Miss Internacional Paraguay 2010, crowned her successors Alba Riquelme, Nicole Huber and Stephanía Vázquez at the end of the event. The winners have the right to represent Paraguay in the 3 major international beauty pageants, Miss Universe 2011, Miss World 2011 and Miss International 2011. The pageant was broadcast live on Telefuturo.

Results

Special Awards
The special awards were given during the "Gala de la Belleza" event held on June 19, 2011, at Hotel Guaraní Esplendor.

Delegates
There are 15 official contestants.

Judges
The following persons judged the final competition.
Ignacio Kliche
Salvador Mas
Mariángela Martínez
Tania Domaniczky
María Eugenia Torres
Hugo González
Humberto Gilardini

See also
Miss Paraguay

Notes 
 Alexandra Fretes was chosen Miss Expo 2009, she also represented Paraguay at the 2010 Miss Supranational Pageant held in Płock, Poland.
 Lourdes Motta is the only delegate chosen in a preliminary competition, she won Miss Ciudad del Este 2010.

External links
Miss Universo Paraguay Official Website.
Promociones Gloria.
MissParaguay.org.

References

2011
2011 beauty pageants
2011 in Paraguay
June 2011 events in South America